James Alexander Hemenway (March 8, 1860February 10, 1923) was a United States representative and Senator from Indiana. Born in Boonville, Indiana, he attended the common schools, studied law, and was admitted to the bar, commencing practice in Boonville in 1885. He was prosecuting attorney for the second judicial circuit of Indiana from 1886 to 1890 and was elected as a Republican to the Fifty-fourth and to the five succeeding Congresses and served from March 4, 1895, until his resignation, effective March 3, 1905, at the close of the Fifty-eighth Congress, having been elected Senator. While in the House of Representatives, he was chairman of the Committee on Appropriations (Fifty-eighth Congress).

Hemenway was elected to the U.S. Senate to fill the vacancy caused by the resignation of Charles W. Fairbanks and served from March 4, 1905, to March 3, 1909; he was an unsuccessful candidate for reelection. While in the Senate he was chairman of the Committee on University of the United States (Fifty-ninth and Sixtieth Congresses). After the Senate, he resumed the practice of law in Boonville. He donated generously to the Old Presbyterian Church in Boonville, which his family had attended for generations. He died in Miami, Florida; interment was in Maple Grove Cemetery, Boonville.

Hemenway is the namesake of the community of Hemenway, Missouri.

Notes

External links 
 

1860 births
1923 deaths
Indiana lawyers
American prosecutors
People from Warrick County, Indiana
Republican Party United States senators from Indiana
19th-century American lawyers
Republican Party members of the United States House of Representatives from Indiana